The 2009 Tri Nations Series was the fourteenth annual Tri Nations rugby union series between the national rugby union teams of New Zealand, Australia and South Africa, respectively nicknamed the All Blacks, Wallabies, and Springboks. The Springboks secured the season crown in their final match on 12 September, defeating the defending series champion All Blacks 32–29 in Hamilton.

Background 
New Zealand, South Africa and Australia were ranked first, second, and third in the world respectively by the International Rugby Board (IRB) immediately before the start of the Tri Nations on 30 June 2009. For South Africa, the tournament comes on the back of the British & Irish Lions tour.

Tri-Nations 2009 
On 18 July, the All Blacks drew first blood in the series, coming from behind to defeat the Wallabies 22–16 at Eden Park. The All Blacks then departed for a two-test series against the Springboks in South Africa. The Boks won the first test 28–19, a result that not only gave them the series lead but also put them ahead of the All Blacks for first place in the IRB World Rankings. The following week, they defeated the All Blacks again, with Morné Steyn scoring all of their points in a 31–19 win. Steyn's performance broke the previous mark of New Zealand's Andrew Mehrtens for individual points in a Tri Nations match. The Boks completed their home leg with a 29–17 win over the Wallabies in Cape Town, with Steyn scoring 24 of their points.

The series then travelled to Australia for the Wallabies' three home matches. It opened with the second Bledisloe Cup match with the All Blacks, won by the All Blacks 19–18. The Springboks then picked up a 32–25 bonus-point win over the Wallabies in Perth.
The Wallabies then defeated the Springboks 21–6, at Brisbane.
The Springboks had to wait another week to try grasp the Tri-Nations title, but had to face the All Blacks at home in Hamilton. The Boks claimed the Tri Nations crown for the first time since 2004 with a 32–29 win. In the final match of the series on 19 September, the All Blacks thumped the Wallabies 33–6 in Wellington.

The final match of the Bledisloe Cup series between Australia and New Zealand took place after the Tri-Nations, on 11 October (the first 3 matches of the series were part of the Tri-Nations).

Standings

Fixtures

New Zealand vs. Australia 

Notes:
 George Smith (Australia) won his 100th test cap, the 10th player to reach that milestone.

South Africa vs. New Zealand

South Africa vs. New Zealand 

Notes:
 Morné Steyn's 31 points set a new individual record for points in a Tri Nations match, breaking Andrew Mehrtens' previous mark of 29 for the All Blacks against Australia at Eden Park in 1999 as well as the most points scored by an individual in a game against the All Blacks. It is also an all-time Test record for most points by a player who was responsible for all of his team's scoring.

South Africa vs. Australia

Australia vs. New Zealand

Australia vs. South Africa

Australia vs. South Africa

New Zealand vs. South Africa 

Notes:
Morné Steyn became the highest individual point scorer in a Tri-Nations season with 95 points this season alone.
Dan Carter's first penalty made him the leading point scorer in Tri Nations history, surpassing former All Black Andrew Mehrtens. Carter entered the match with 326 Tri Nations points to Mehrtens' 328, and ended the evening with 345.

New Zealand vs. Australia 

Notes:
 Dan Carter surpassed Ronan O'Gara as the 5th highest point scorer with 930 points

References

External links 
 All Blacks Tri Nations website
 
 Wallabies Tri Nations website

2009
2009 in South African rugby union
2009 in New Zealand rugby union
2009 in Australian rugby union
Tri